Lin Ling (born 9 September 1977) is a table tennis player from China. She started competing for Hong Kong in 2002. Since 2000, she has won several medals in singles, doubles, and team events in the Asian Table Tennis Championships, the Table Tennis World Cup, and the World Table Tennis Championships.

See also
 List of table tennis players

References

1977 births
Living people
Chinese female table tennis players
Hong Kong female table tennis players
Olympic table tennis players of Hong Kong
Table tennis players at the 2004 Summer Olympics
Table tennis players at the 2008 Summer Olympics
Sportspeople from Fuzhou
Table tennis players at the 2010 Asian Games
Table tennis players at the 2006 Asian Games
Table tennis players from Fujian
Asian Games competitors for China